Petroscirtes breviceps, the striped poison-fang blenny mimic, striped fangblenny mimic, short-head sabretooth blenny, short-headed blenny, sabretooth blenny, or the black-banded blenny, is a species of combtooth blenny found in coral reefs in the western Pacific and Indian ocean. This species reaches a length of  SL.

References

External links
 

breviceps
Fish described in 1836